Sylvi Inkeri Salonen (1 March 1920 – 23 December 2003) was a Finnish actress.  Most of her career, 1949−1985, she worked for Tampereen Työväen Teatteri while also appearing on television and in films. The term "diva" was often attached to her name.

During her final years, Salonen arranged a statue of a black panther to be placed on her grave.

On television 

Heikki ja Kaija (1961−1971)
Tankki täyteen (1978−1980)
Nitroliiga (1993)
Tuliportaat (1998)

In films 

Tavaratalo Lapatossu & Vinski (1940)
SF-Paraati (1940)
Opri (1954)
Elokuu (1956)
Kuuma kissa? (1968)
Kun Hunttalan Matti Suomen osti (1984)
The Big Freeze (1993)

References

External links 
 

1920 births
2003 deaths
People from Ulvila
Finnish actresses
Finnish film actresses